Byrapura  is a village in the southern state of Karnataka, India. It is located in the Tirumakudal Narsipur taluk of Mysore district.

Demographics
 India census, Byrapura had a population of 12095 with 6170 males and 5925 females.

See also
 Mysore
 Districts of Karnataka

References

External links

Villages in Mysore district